Escort Way is a  country road in New South Wales, Australia, running from Orange via Parkes to Escort Way in Boree. It is named after Henry Parkes, a long-serving premier of the Colony of New South Wales, and promoter for the federation of the six colonies of Australia.

Route
Henry Parkes Way commences at the intersection of William and Bathurst Streets at Condobolin and heads in an easterly direction through Bogan Gate to Parkes, and from there via Manildra, before it ends at an intersection with Escort Way at Boree. It is a single-carriageway, two-lane sealed road for its entire length.

History
The passing of the Main Roads Act of 1924 through the Parliament of New South Wales provided for the declaration of Main Roads, roads partially funded by the State government through the Main Roads Board (later the Department of Main Roads, and eventually Transport for NSW). Main Road No. 224 was declared along this road on 8 August 1928, from Condobolin via Parkes and Manildra to the intersection with Orange-Eugowra Road (today Escort Way) at Boree. With the passing of the Main Roads (Amendment) Act of 1929 to provide for additional declarations of State Highways and Trunk Roads, this was amended to Main Road 224 on 8 April 1929.

Trunk Road 61 was re-aligned to run between Orange and Condobolin via Parkes on 6 April 1938 (subsuming Main Road 224); its former alignment between Condobolin via Eugowra and Cudal to Boree was replaced by Main Road 377 (later named part of Lachlan Valley Way and Escort Way).

The passing of the Roads Act of 1993 updated road classifications and the way they could be declared within New South Wales. Under this act, Henry Parkes Way today retains its declaration as part of Main Road 61, from Condobolin to Boree.

Henry Parkes Way was signed State Route 90 in 1974. With the conversion to the newer alphanumeric system in 2013, State Route 90 was removed and not replaced.

Major intersections

See also

 Highways in Australia
 List of highways in New South Wales

References

Highways in New South Wales
Highways in Australia